Sams Creek is a stream in the U.S. state of West Virginia.

Sams Creek was named after Jonathan Sams, a pioneer who settled there.

See also
List of rivers of West Virginia

References

Rivers of Wood County, West Virginia
Rivers of West Virginia